Raghunathbari Ramtarak High School is a high school in Raghunathbari, Purba Medinipur district, in the Indian state of West Bengal. It is the 3rd oldest school in Panskura.

History 

The 6th Mohanta Ramtarak Babaji established a Higher English School for students reading in M.E. school of Raghunathbari temple started by the 5th Mohanta Haranarayan. Earlier he offered to pay for to upgrade Panskura M.E. School (known as Panskura Bradley Birt High School) during 1911–12. He consulted his secretary Harekrishna Maiti and convened a meeting on Dec. 29, 1912 with about 200 villagers.

Mohantaji become ill and went to Haridwar where he discussed the future of this school. Immediately after returning from Haridwar the foundation stone was laid by him in 1914.

On Jan 29, 1915 a meeting was convened to form the Managing committee of the school. In 1916 Calcutta University approved the school.

References

High schools and secondary schools in West Bengal
Schools in Purba Medinipur district
Educational institutions established in 1915
1915 establishments in India